Concours or EU concours is a recruitment competition and examination to select staff to all institutions of the European Union.

Explanation of open competition 

According to the web site of the European Personnel Selection Office, whose mission is to organise and administer open competitions to select staff for recruitment to all institutions of the EU, all permanent staff for the EU institutions are recruited through open competitions (commonly referred to as concours in all languages, originally referring to the French public administration's recruitment exams).

Number of applicants 

These attract a very considerable number of applicants from all over Europe.

Permanent positions 

Passing the competition is the principal way to become a permanent official in an EU institution. Other smaller competitions may provide an entry route to the select few.

Temporary positions 

Regarding non-permanent jobs like temporary agents, a similar selection takes place.

Open competitions 

EU open competitions are published in the C series of the Official Journal (OJ) of the European Union.

Specific conditions 

The OJ gives the specific conditions and requirements for each published competition, along with an indication of the number of posts available.

A third level diploma is normally required, and EU citizenship. Candidates must have at least two EU languages: both a 'main language', which can be any of the 24 EU languages, and a 'second language', which must be English, German, or French. The concours tests both languages.

There are usually 3 stages to each competition.

 Pre-selection Tests
 Written Tests
 Interview

The pre-selection tests normally cover

 EU knowledge- extensive subject matter knowledge can be required
 Verbal reasoning
 Numerical reasoning
 Specific knowledge related to the particular field of the competition applied for (e.g.: scientific/ human resources/ law etc.)

The candidate normally has to take the pre selection test in the second language. It usually consists of multiple choice questions.

Written tests involve essay-type exams and candidates may have to write something based on analysis of information provided. The first and second language may be required.

The interview may test both languages.

Examination centres are frequently set up in each member state – sometimes more than one centre in larger countries – but the interviews are generally held in Brussels or Luxembourg.

Positions available 

The number of positions is not communicated. Only the number of places on the reserve list is always stated in the notice of competition.

Reserve list 

This number indicates how many successful candidates will be placed on the reserve list, however, it does not guarantee that all of them will actually get a job.

Successful applicants who withdraw 

Many candidates change their minds throughout the application process, so positions that appear to be filled sometimes become available.

See also 
 Civil servant
 Civil service entrance examination
 European Civil Service

External links 
 EU law visualized: EUR-Charts - Essential EU Law in Charts

European Union
Government recruitment

ja:コンクール